Pchelniki is a rural locality (a selo) in Stupinskoye Rural Settlement, Ramonsky District, Voronezh Oblast, Russia. The population was 56 as of 2010. There are 8 streets.

Geography 
Pchelniki is located 17 km northeast of Ramon (the district's administrative centre) by road. Belyayevo is the nearest rural locality.

References 

Rural localities in Ramonsky District